Vanishing Falls is a ledge waterfall in south-west Tasmania, Australia that drains into a sinkhole. It is located on the Salisbury River within the Southwest National Park.

Description
At Vanishing Falls, the Salisbury River flows over a dolerite plateau underlain by limestone. The river flows over the edge of the dolerite sill and drains straight into a cave system in the limestone, a phenomenon attributed to karst processes. The above-ground channel downstream of the plunge pool flows only during floods.

The Salisbury River is a tributary of the New River.

Access
The falls are surrounded by dense scrub and are located in remote wilderness, accordingly there are no designated trails leading to the falls.

See also

List of waterfalls of Tasmania
Protected areas of Tasmania

References

Further reading
Skyline No. 23 - Vanishing Falls

External links
Parks & Wildlife Service Tasmania

Waterfalls of Tasmania
South West Tasmania